Agents of Chaos is an American documentary miniseries directed by Alex Gibney and Javier Alberto Botero, revolving around Russian interference in the 2016 United States elections. It premiered on September 23, 2020, on HBO.

Plot
It follows Russian interference in the 2016 United States elections.  Andrew Weissmann, Andrew McCabe, John Brennan, Carter Page, Felix Sater, Margarita Simonyan, Celeste Wallander and Camille François appear in the series.

Episodes

Reception

Critical reception
On Rotten Tomatoes, the series holds an approval rating of 81% based on 16 reviews, with an average rating of 7.91/10.
On Metacritic, the series has a weighted average score of 79 out of 100, based on 10 critics, indicating "generally favorable reviews".

References

External links
 
 
 

2020s American documentary television series
2020 American television series debuts
2020 American television series endings
English-language television shows
HBO original programming
HBO documentary films